Castex may refer to:

People 
 Castex (surname)
 Castex government

Places 
 Castex, Ariège in the Ariège department, France
 Castex, Gers, in the Gers department, France
 Castex-d'Armagnac, in the Gers department, France